HMS Saint Patrick was a 50-gun fourth-rate ship of the line of the English Royal Navy. In 1665, during the Second Anglo-Dutch War, the Navy Committee of Parliament adopted a supplement to their 1664 Programme which provided for one third rate (Warspite) and three fourth rates. The King's chronic financial worries led to the cancellation of the contracts for two of the fourth rates, but the remaining vessel, awarded to Bristol shipbuilder Francis Bayley, was completed in barely a year at the contract price of £6 per ton, measuring slightly larger than her contract dimensions of 100 ft keel length and 32 ft 6 in breadth. Launched in May 1666 at Bristol, the ship proved an outstanding success as a fast, weatherly sailing warship.

Commissioned a month after her launch under Captain Robert Saunders, the Saint Patrick joined Sir Robert Robinson's squadron on Christmas Day 1666. However, less than nine months after being launched, she was captured off the North Foreland on 5 February 1667 by the Dutch 34-gun Delft and 28-gun Shakerlo, after a battle which left Saunders and 8 of his crew dead and another 16 wounded. She was commissioned by the Dutch Navy later in 1667 as the Zwanenburg.

Notes

References

Lavery, Brian (2003) The Ship of the Line - Volume 1: The development of the battlefleet 1650-1850. Conway Maritime Press. .
Winfield, Rif (2009) British Warships in the Age of Sail: 1603 - 1714. Seaforth Publishing. .

Ships of the line of the Royal Navy
Ships of the line of the Dutch Republic
Ships built in Bristol
1660s ships
Captured ships